The Central Market in Casablanca, Morocco is a marketplace with historical and cultural significance. It is located on Muhammad V Boulevard, among the colonial architecture of the 20th century, facing the Central Market Tramway Station.

History 
The Central Market was designed by Pierre Bousquet, and construction was completed in 1917, on the site of the Casablanca Fair of 1915.

The Central Market was the most important marketplace in Casablanca's European ville nouvelle.

The Moroccan nationalist resistance fighter Muhammad Zarqtuni bombed the Central Market on December 24, 1953, after French forces forced Sultan Muhammad VI into exile on August 20, 1953—which was Eid al-Adha.

Architecture 

The market is characterized by its Neo-Mauresque architectural style. Among its most prominent features is its large gateway, imitating styles of gates in Morocco's imperial cities: Marrakesh, Fes, Rabat, and Meknes.

Another feature of the market is the octagonal center cupola, under which different kinds of fresh seafood are sold, such as fish of the Atlantic Ocean, shark meat, oysters, etc. The daily catch is displayed around a circular walkway, as well in a central island where oysters from Dakhla are shucked on the spot for one-by-one consumption.

Flowers are also sold in decorated bouquets, as well as handicrafts such as woven reed baskets. There are also fossils and antiques, such as old black and white photographs and posters.

Produce is also sold, in addition to herbs, spices, and meat from butcher shops.

The market houses some restaurants as well, and is considered one of the most important lunch destinations for tourists and Casawis alike.

Access 
The Central Market Station on Line 1 of the Casablanca Tramway is directly in front of the Central Market's main entrance on Muhammad V Street.

References 

Bazaars
Casablanca
Retail markets in Africa